The 2003 Mississippi gubernatorial election took place on November 4, 2003 to elect the governor of the U.S. state of Mississippi.  Former Republican National Committee chairman Haley Barbour defeated incumbent Democrat Ronnie Musgrove by a margin of 6.78%.

As of 2018, the election remains the most expensive gubernatorial election in state history, with over $18 million having been spent between Barbour and Musgrove.  An additional $5 million was spent by the Republican Governors Association, mostly on television advertising.  Barbour's victory in the election made him only the second Republican governor of Mississippi since Reconstruction.

Democratic primary

Candidates
Gilbert Fountain, perennial candidate
Elder McClendon
Ronnie Musgrove, incumbent Governor of Mississippi
Katie Perrone
Catherine Starr, activist

Campaign
Musgrove was elected governor in 1999 after a very close election against Michael Parker. As neither candidate had obtained a majority in the election, Musgrove was chosen as governor by the Democratic controlled Mississippi House of Representatives.

As governor, Musgrove had difficulties with the state's legislators. He vetoed the whole budget one year but was overridden by the legislature. However, Musgrove campaigned on having secured the largest pay rise for teachers in the state's history.

Results

Republican primary

Candidates
Haley Barbour, Chairman of Republican National Committee, political consultant, Republican nominee for the United States Senate in 1982
Mitch Tyner, attorney

Campaign
Barbour, a former advisor in the White House during the presidency of Ronald Reagan and Chairman of the Republican National Committee from 1993 to 1996, announced that he would run for governor on February 17, 2003. He had previously failed to be elected to the U.S. Senate for Mississippi in 1982, and in 1983 he travelled the state for several months to gauge support for his gubernatorial bid.

Results

General election

Campaign
Musgrove campaigned as an independent and conservative candidate, downplaying his membership in the Democratic Party and avoiding inviting any national figures to support him. He criticized Barbour for being a lobbyist for the tobacco and pharmaceutical industries. A key message of Musgrove's campaign was that Barbour's support for free trade would cost jobs in Mississippi.

Barbour attacked Musgrove for his flawed leadership of the state, blaming him for the state of the economy of Mississippi. He was helped by the President, George Bush, who made three trips to the state to support Barbour. Several other leading Republican figures came to Mississippi to support Barbour including Dick Cheney, Jeb Bush and Rudy Giuliani.

A poll in October 2003 showed Barbour having a narrow lead, with 50% saying they would vote for him as against 45% for Musgrove. However another poll at the beginning of November showed Musgrove with 42% against 41% for Barbour and both sides regarded turnout as key to the election.

Exit polls showed that black voters made up a third of the vote and 94% of them backed Musgrove. However among white voters 77% backed Barbour and a quarter of voters who supported Musgrove in his first election in 1999 now backed Barbour.

Results

References

External links
 Mississippi Certified Election Results

Gubernatorial
2003
Mississippi